The Symmes Purchase, also known as the Miami Purchase, was an area of land totaling roughly  in what is now Hamilton, Butler, and Warren counties of southwestern Ohio, purchased by Judge John Cleves Symmes of New Jersey in 1788 from the Continental Congress.

History
In the 1780s, Benjamin Stites, a friend of Symmes, was visiting Limestone (now Maysville, Kentucky) and lost some of his horses to theft by Native Americans. Pursuing them through the wilderness of southwestern Ohio, he travelled as far north as Xenia, observing the fertility of the country in the process. He was so impressed with the region that he informed Symmes of its prospects upon his return. Symmes gathered a syndicate, known as the Miami Company, to buy the land. The land was ¢ per acre.

Location
The tract is bordered on the south by the Ohio River, on the west by the Great Miami River, and on the east by the Little Miami River. The northern boundary runs through Butler and Warren Counties about 25 miles north of the Ohio River. Sections of Todhunter and Garver Roads in Monroe, Monroe Road in Lebanon, and Oregonia Road in Turtlecreek Township run along the boundary.

Survey
Deeds in this area will refer to the "Between the Miami Rivers Survey", "M.Rs." or "M.R.S." (M.R.S. is also used to describe the "Miami River Survey" a survey west of the Great Miami River).

Unfortunately, Symmes' men committed many errors while performing the survey, including using magnetic north rather than correcting for true north. Further, Symmes sold much land that he did not own, some as far north as Dayton, meaning that some early settlers found themselves squatters on the public domain. Symmes also sold some land that he did own more than once.

Settlement
Three settlements grew up in the area in 1788, all near the Ohio River: Losantiville, North Bend, and Columbia.  Losantiville was renamed Cincinnati in 1789 by Arthur St. Clair, governor of the Northwest Territory.  They were among the earliest settlements in Ohio and the Northwest Territory.  In 1789, Fort Washington was built in the reserved portion of the Purchase to protect the fledgling settlements.

See also
 Ohio Company Purchase
 Ohio lands
 Land Ordinance of 1785

References

Former regions and territories of the United States
Pre-statehood history of Ohio
Warren County, Ohio
Hamilton County, Ohio
Butler County, Ohio
History of Dayton, Ohio